The F class of US Navy blimps comprised a single airship, built during World War I by Goodyear as one of a group of three small blimps offered to the US government. Two were purchased for the US Navy and one for the US Army. The Navy blimps were designated E-1, F-1, and the Army airship A-1. Classified as an "Experimental Engine Testing Dirigible." F-1 had the same envelope size as the E-1, due to the use of a tractor mounted 125 hp Union engine, the performance was different. F-1 spent its entire career at Hampton Roads (Norfolk, Virginia). It was flown in both tractor and pusher configurations. It also may have been flown with a Curtiss OXX engine. F-1 was removed from inventory in November 1923.

Specifications

References

See also

1910s United States experimental aircraft
Airships of the United States Navy
Goodyear aircraft